Kris Hansen (December 21, 1969 – July 7, 2022) was an American politician who was a Republican member of the Montana Legislature. She was elected in 2010 to House District 33 which represents the Havre and Western Hill County area. In 2014, she won election to the Montana Senate District 14, unseating Democratic incumbent Greg Jergeson, with 4,080 to his 3,196. She resigned in 2016 to become chief legal counsel for the state auditor’s office, and was replaced by fellow Republican Russ Tempel.

Hansen served in the national guard, and was a veteran of the Iraq war. She died on July 7, 2022, at the age of 52.

References

External links
Kris Hansen For Montana House  — official campaign site

1969 births
2022 deaths
Republican Party members of the Montana House of Representatives
Augustana College (Illinois) alumni
Politicians from Peoria, Illinois
United States Army personnel of the Iraq War
United States Army officers
People from Havre, Montana